Martin + Me is a solo album by J Mascis, his first.  It was released in 1996.

The album documents a 1995 solo acoustic tour.  The Martin of the title refers to Mascis's Martin guitar.  The album contains Dinosaur Jr. songs as well as covers of Carly Simon, Greg Sage, Lynyrd Skynyrd, and others.

Critical reception
The album received mixed reviews, with some critics comparing Mascis (both favorably and unfavorably) to Neil Young. Rolling Stone wrote that "these bare-bones interpretations add nothing to the songs besides a new vocal and lyrical clarity, and considering the annoying nature of Mascis' nasal whine and the tossed-off quality of his lyrics, that isn't a good thing."

Track listing
All tracks composed by J Mascis; except where noted

References

1996 live albums
Reprise Records live albums
J Mascis albums